Escort is a British men's adult magazine which contains softcore pornography and erotica. It is published by Paul Raymond Publications.

Paul Raymond Publications releases a number of magazines similar to Escort, including Club International, Mayfair, Men Only, Men's World, and Razzle. The origin of these titles lies in businessman Paul Raymond's expansion from strip club management into magazine publishing in the 1960s.

Publication history 
A monthly pin-up magazine with the title Escort was published between 1958 and 1971 by City Magazines. The title was acquired by Raymond, and from 1971 to 1980 was incorporated into another title he had acquired from City Magazines, Men Only.

In 1980, Raymond began publishing Escort as a top-shelf magazine with the revived title. By 2012, Escort was in its 32nd year, or volume. The magazine is also sold in digital format. Initially this was via the Paul Raymond digital newsstand from 2013 until that website closed. Subsequently it has been available digitally from the publisher's main website.

Content 
The magazine's content is a combination of photographs and text, with the photographs almost entirely being those of partially or completely nude women.

Escort specialises in pictures of amateur (i.e. non-professional) models, some of which are sent to the magazine by readers – these are described as "readers' wives".  It often features photo-shoots taken in an "ordinary" location like a pub, or outdoors at a place familiar to British readers.

In 2008 Stephen Bleach, who had worked as publishing director for Paul Raymond Publications, described Escort as "cheerfully brazen" in contrast to Club International and Men Only, which he described as "pseudo-glamorous". In 2013 Escort was described by Pierre Perrone, a former magazine editor for the company, as "downmarket".

Up to and including vol. 15 (1995), Escort had a distinctive 'cut-out' cover, which folded out into a poster; this 'cut-out' design allowed a few smaller pictures on the contents page to be visible, thus giving a preview of other women posing in the magazine; one of these smaller pictures was usually that from the magazine's regular Girls of ... feature showing women posing at various locations of that issue's chosen town.

Escort is widely available in British newsagents, although some larger retailers require a modesty bag in order to protect minors from seeing partial nudity on display on the cover. Escort also has a digital identity on the official Paul Raymond website, where the hardcore imagery not found in the print version is also shown.

See also
 List of pornographic magazines
 Outline of British pornography
 Pornography in the United Kingdom

References

External links
 
Official digital newsstand of Paul Raymond Publications

Men's magazines published in the United Kingdom
Monthly magazines published in the United Kingdom
Pornographic magazines published in the United Kingdom
Magazines established in 1958
Magazines established in 1980
Softcore pornography
1980 establishments in the United Kingdom